Isaac Aedo Kailea is an Australian rugby union player who plays for the  in Super Rugby. His playing position is prop. He was named in the Rebels development squad for the 2021 Super Rugby AU season.

Super Rugby statistics

Reference list

External links
Rugby.com.au profile
itsrugby.co.uk profile

Australian rugby union players
Living people
Rugby union props
Year of birth missing (living people)
Melbourne Rebels players